The Milwaukee District North Line (MD-N) is a Metra commuter rail line in Chicago, Illinois, and its northern suburbs. Although Metra does not refer to any of its lines by color, the timetable accents for the Milwaukee District North line are pale "Hiawatha Orange" in honor of the Milwaukee Road's Hiawatha passenger trains.

The line utilizes the Canadian Pacific Railway's C&M Subdivision from Chicago to Rondout and Metra's Fox Lake Subdivision from Rondout to Fox Lake.

Operations 

Metra operates a reduced schedule on weekends, with nine trains operating between Union Station and Fox Lake, with an additional train on Saturday afternoons that short-turns at Lake Forest.

Metra began increased reverse commute service on the line on March 4, 2019. This service is part of a pilot-program funded under a two-year, public-private partnership between Metra and Lake County Partners. The increased reverse commute service was temporarily suspended during the COVID-19 pandemic, but was reinstated in December 2022. 

Metra has included the possibility of extending the Milwaukee District North Line along one of two routes in their Cost Benefit Analysis report. If this were to happen, the line could continue northwest via the Fox Lake branch to Richmond, with an additional stop in Spring Grove. Alternatively, the line could be extended north along the C&M Subdivision and continue from Rondout to Wadsworth, with additional stops in Green Oaks, Waukegan (separate from the Union Pacific North Line's station,) and Gurnee.

History 
Before 1982, this line was operated by the Chicago, Milwaukee, St. Paul and Pacific Railroad (Milwaukee Road). When the Milwaukee Road went bankrupt, the Regional Transportation Authority took over operation of the line. By 1984, the line passed to RTA's newly created Commuter Rail Division, which rebranded as Metra in 1985. Metra acquired the line from the Soo Line Railroad in 1987. Today this service is one of several Metra routes operated by Metra crews, but trains are dispatched, under contract, by the Canadian Pacific Railway through its American subsidiary, the Soo Line Railroad, which operates freight trains over this route via trackage rights.

The Milwaukee District/North Line route and Metra's track ownership diverge from the Chicago - Milwaukee - Minneapolis mainline at Rondout, Illinois and proceeds northwesterly toward Fox Lake. This secondary route, owned by Metra, was known as the Janesville Subdivision (J-Sub) of the Milwaukee Road. The mainline north of Rondout is owned by the Canadian Pacific Railway (CP) through its American subsidiary Soo Line Railroad and sees Amtrak and freight traffic only. Metra service and track ownership end at Fox Lake. The tracks beyond Fox Lake are owned by the State of Wisconsin and operated for freight service by the Wisconsin and Southern Railroad. Commuter service beyond Fox Lake, abolished in 1982, served the communities of Spring Grove, Solon Mills, Zenda, and Walworth. 

Until 1984, there was a stop in Rondout. The station building itself was demolished in the mid-1960s. The station was located at Rondout Junction, where the line crosses the Elgin, Joliet and Eastern Railway's tracks at a diamond junction. Before 1982, service ran as far north as Walworth, Wisconsin.

Metra has conducted studies on extending the Milwaukee District / North Line to Richmond, Illinois, and constructing a second branch, running along the Canadian Pacific main line from Rondout north to Wadsworth. However, there are not any plans to construct the extension.

Ridership
Between 2014 and 2019, annual ridership declined from 7,237,913 to 6,549,143, an overall decline of 9.5%. Due to the COVID-19 pandemic, ridership dropped to 1,556,783 passengers in 2020 and to 1,094,292 in 2021. Despite this overall annual decline, from April to December 2021, ridership was higher than in the same period in 2020.

Stations

References

External links 

 Metra Milwaukee District/North service schedule

Metra lines
Chicago, Milwaukee, St. Paul and Pacific Railroad